The 2003–04 Cincinnati Bearcats men's basketball team represented University of Cincinnati as a member of Conference USA during the 2003–04 NCAA Division I men's basketball season. The head coach was Bob Huggins, serving in his 15th year at the school. The team finished in a 5-way tie atop the conference regular season standings and won the Conference USA tournament titles to earn an automatic bid to the NCAA tournament as No. 4 seed in the Atlanta region. The Bearcats finished with a 25–7 record (12–4 C-USA).

Roster

Source

Schedule and results

|-
!colspan=12 style=|Regular Season 

|-
!colspan=12 style=|Conference USA Tournament 

|-
!colspan=12 style=|NCAA tournament

Rankings

*AP did not release a Week 1 poll nor post-NCAA Tournament rankings

References

Cincinnati Bearcats men's basketball seasons
Cincinnati
Cincinnati
Cincin
Cincin